Peter Paul Brauer (16 May 1899, in Elberfeld – 28 April 1959, in Berlin) was a German film producer and film director.

In 1928, he became involved in film production in the Netherlands. That same year he returned to Germany and, over several years, produced several short films.  After the takeover of the Nazis in March 1933, Brauer was production manager at the UFA. After 1938, he directed a number of feature films, mostly comedies.

Between April 1939 and November 1940 Brauer was production chief of Terra Film.  At the beginning of 1940, Brauer was assigned by Propaganda Minister Joseph Goebbels to produce the anti-Semitic film Jud Süß (1940).  Brauer assigned himself the task of directing the film; however, he ran into difficulties in casting.  Frustrated at the delay, Goebbels removed him in favor of Veit Harlan.

In the 1940s, Brauer concentrated on directing and collaborated on some screenplays.  Brauer was a member of the Nazi Party.

Filmography

Producer
1933: Die Wette
1933: Die verlorene Melodie
1933: Der streitbare Herr Kickel
1933: Der Störenfried
1933: Das 13. Weltwunder
1933: Alles für Anita!
1933: Eine ideale Wohnung
1934: Zwei Genies
1934: Ritter wider Willen
1934: Lottchens Geburtstag
1934: Liebe und Zahnweh
1934: Ich bin Du
1934: Hochzeit am 13.
1934: Erstens kommt es anders
1935: Zimmer zu vermieten
1935: Dreimal Ehe
1935: Schnitzel fliegt
1935: Der eingebildete Kranke
1935: The Girl from the Marsh Croft 
1935: UFA-Märchen
1935: April, April!
1936: Früh übt sich
1937: Bluff
1937: Gewitterflug zu Claudia
1953: The Dancing Heart

Director
1928: Der Boxstudent
1931: Der Erlkönig (Director and co-Screenwriter)
1935: Die Gesangsstunde
1935: Der Uhrenladen
1935: Der große Preis von Europa
1936: Vier Mädel und ein Mann
1936: Kalbsragout mit Champignons
1937: Die perfekte Sekretärin
1937: Das Quartett
1938: The Girl of Last Night (co-Director)
1938: Was tun, Sybille? (co-Director)
1938: Das Verlegenheitskind (co-Director)
1939: Ich bin gleich wieder da (co-Director)
1941: The Swedish Nightingale 
1941: Die Kellnerin Anna (Director and co-Screenwriter)
1942: Sein Sohn (Director and co-Screenwriter)
1942: Der Seniorchef
1943: Heaven, We Inherit a Castle 
1943: Die Jungfern vom Bischofsberg
1944: Glück bei Frauen
1951: Es begann um Mitternacht

See also 
List of films made in the Third Reich
Nazism and cinema

References

External links

1899 births
1959 deaths
Film people from North Rhine-Westphalia
People from Elberfeld
Germany articles needing attention
Nazi Party members
Mass media people from Wuppertal